Hallelujah Time! is an album by organist Jack McDuff recorded between 1963 and 1966 and released on the Prestige label.

Reception
Allmusic awarded the album 3 stars.

Track listing 
All compositions by Jack McDuff except as indicated
 "Almost Like Being in Love" (Alan Jay Lerner, Frederick Loewe) - 5:41  
 "East of the Sun" (Brooks Bowman) - 5:06  
 "Au Privave" (Charlie Parker) - 3:19  
 "Undecided" (Sid Robin, Charlie Shavers) - 8:00  
 "Hallelujah Time" (Oscar Peterson) - 3:45  
 "The Live People" - 4:16

Personnel 
 Jack McDuff - organ
 Red Holloway (tracks 1-5), Harold Ousley (track 6) - tenor saxophone
 George Benson (tracks 2-5), Pat Martino (tracks 1 & 6) - guitar
 Joe Dukes - drums

References 

 

Jack McDuff albums
1967 albums
Prestige Records albums